Wycliffe and the Guild of Nine (2000) is a crime novel by Cornish writer W. J. Burley.

Synopsis
On the moor west of St Ives, an artists' colony has been running on the site of a disused mine, run by the married astrologers Archer and Lina. The latest member is the shadowy and beautiful Francine, who hopes to invest a legacy into the business. Because of her Scorpio star sign, Archer isn't convinced, although Lina soon accepts her offer.

However, the trouble begins when Francine is found dead, killed by a deliberately blocked gas heater. Wycliffe soon makes his presence known as a murder investigation begins, and he quickly learns that several of the creative souls assembled have justifiable reasons for not wanting the police intruding on their private affairs. ...

References

2000 British novels
Wycliffe series
Victor Gollancz Ltd books
St Ives, Cornwall
Novels set in Cornwall